Carl Adams may refer to:
 Carl Adams (racing driver) (born 1942), American NASCAR driver
 Carl Adams (wrestler) (born 1950), American wrestler and businessman

See also
 Karl Adams (disambiguation)